The 1907–08 Georgia Bulldogs basketball team represents the University of Georgia during the 1907–08 college men's basketball season. The team finished the season with an overall record of 2–2.

Schedule

|-

References

Georgia Bulldogs basketball seasons
Georgia
Bulldogs
Bulldogs